The Hayat Baksh Bagh, which means "Life-bestowing garden", is the largest of the gardens in the Red Fort in Delhi . The North Eastern portion of the Red Fort. It was built by Mughal Emperor Shah Jahan. The garden is beautifully decorated by pools, fountains, canals, walled enclosures and channels. Mostly the Mughal architectures are inspired by Islamic culture but this garden is more influenced by Persian culture.

History 

It was laid out by Shah Jahan I. It had the size of around 200 square feet. The garden was largely destroyed by the British colonial forces following the failed 1857 rebellion. Most of the garden was built over by stone barracks by the British colonialists after 1857. Lord Curzon had some elements of the garden restored.

The garden is divided into four squares, with causeways, water channels and a star-shaped parterre framed with red sandstone. Originally, flowers in blue, white and purple were planted throughout.

Three structures have survived from the time:

Sawan and Bhadon 

The Sawan and Bhadon pavilions (mandap) are two almost identical structures facing on opposite ends of the canal. They are carved out of white marble. A feature is a section of a wall with niches. Originally small oil lamps would be lit and placed in these niches at night, or vases with golden flowers be placed during the day. The water from the channel would cascade over it, creating the impression of a golden curtain. The names Sawan and Bhadon are the two rainy months in the Hindu calendar during the monsoon. It is not clear however which pavilion carries which name.

Zafar Mahal 

In the middle between the two pavilions lies the Zafar Mahal. This structure was constructed during the reign of Bahadur Shah II in 1842 and named after him. This pavilion stands in the middle of a pre-existing water tank. It is made out of red sandstone, which was cheaper than white marble. Originally a red sandstone bridge led into the pavilion, which was probably lost after the Indian Rebellion of 1857. After the occupation in 1857, the tank was used for a while as a swimming pool by the British troops.

Mehtab Bagh 
West of the garden was another one called Mehtab Bagh, or the "moon garden". This garden was completely destroyed by the British after the failed rebellion and four large military barracks constructed on its spot. There are plans to restore the garden.

Near the northwest corner is a baoli tank. The road from the baoli leads due south to the Delhi Gate of the fort.

References

External links 

Red Fort
Gardens in India